Carolann is a feminine given name that is an alternate spelling of Carol and a variant of Caroline. Notable people known by this name include the following:

Carolann Davids, known as C. A. Davids (born 1971), South African writer and editor
Carolann Héduit (born 2003), French artistic gymnast
Carolann Page (born 1950), American singer and actress
Carolann Susi, a name sometimes used for credits for Carol Ann Susi (1952 – 2014), American actress

See also

Carolan (surname)
Carolane Soucisse
Carolanne
Carolynn